The 4th Act is a 2017 Irish documentary film about the community of Ballymun in north Dublin, Ireland.

Directed by Ballymun native Turlough Kelly, the film was first screened at the Dublin International Film Festival in 2017, showing at the Light House Cinema, the Irish Film Institute and Cineworld Dublin. The documentary was subsequently broadcast on national network TV3 on Good Friday 2018.

Reception 

Sunday Times film critic Liam Fay described The 4th Act as "a vivid and eye-opening documentary about the fallout from decades of mishandled regeneration plans in the north Dublin suburb of Ballymun. The director Turlough Kelly’s deft blending of these archive clips with newly shot material gave the production an air of immediacy, with the people of Ballymun commenting on the tale as it unfolded on screen".

The Irish Independent described the film as "an important documentary", which "shines a much needed spotlight on the disgraceful way the working class in this country has been demonised".

References

External links
 
 

2017 films
Irish documentary films
Films shot in the Republic of Ireland
Irish television films
Films set in Dublin (city)
2010s English-language films